The Cathedral of the Holy Angels is a Catholic cathedral located in Gary, Indiana, United States. It is the seat of the Diocese of Gary, and the home of Holy Angels Parish.

History
Holy Angels Parish was established by the Rev. Thomas F. Jansen in September  1906 in the Diocese of Fort Wayne.  It was the first Catholic parish founded in the city of Gary.  The initial Masses in the parish were celebrated in a tavern at the corner of Fifth Avenue and Broadway.  The first parish building was a combination church and school.  The parishioners were mostly Eastern European, Irish, German and Italian.

Holy Angels School opened in 1909 with the School Sisters of Notre Dame as the faculty.  The parish grew slowly and by the 1940s there was a need for a larger church building.  The Rev. John A. Sullivan was the pastor when the present church was built in the Gothic Revival style.   The cornerstone was laid on October 26, 1947, and it was dedicated on January 29, 1950, by Bishop John F. Noll.

When Pope Pius XII established the Diocese of Gary on December 10, 1956,  Holy Angels Church became the cathedral of the new diocese.

In the 1960s the primarily Caucasian parish began to change as African American and Latin American parishioners joined Holy Angels when St. Anthony's  and Sacred Heart churches closed.  The school building and convent were torn down in 1965 when a new two-story facility was built for $1.2 million.  The building contained school classrooms, a convent, gymnasium, cafeteria and space for a parish hall.  On June 7, 1994, the name of the school was changed to the Sister Thea Bowman School.  It is now a charter school named the Thea Bowman Leadership Academy.

Architecture
On entering the worship space one encounters the baptismal pool and then is led to the altar, which is located in the transept.  The pool is made of travertine marble and the four pillars at the base are from the old high altar. The base and the top of the ambry, where the holy oils are kept, is the former baptismal font.  The upper section is made from black walnut.

The altar is constructed of marble and is roughly square in shape.  In the floor surrounding the altar are angels in mosaic.  They reflect the diversity of the human race and of the diocese itself: African,  Caucasian, Asian and Latin.  In the apse of the cathedral is the reredos from the old high altar with a Calvary grouping.  The cathedra, or bishop's chair, sits in the presbytery in front of the old reredos.  It is carved from black walnut and was installed in 1996.  A carved angel stands next to the chair.  The ambo is constructed of the same materials as the altar and reredos.

The tabernacle is located in the Blessed Sacrament Chapel.  A cross is formed behind the tabernacle by four carved angels in adoration.  The shrine of the Holy Angels is in the east transept.  It includes an icon of the Synaxis of the Holy Angels, which was done in an Ethiopian-Coptic style.  The shrine is dedicated to deceased parishioners and priests of the diocese.  Bishop Andrew Gregory Grutka, the first bishop of Gary, was laid to rest here in 1993.

Pastors/Rectors
The following priests have served as the parish pastors and since 1956 they have served as cathedral rector and carry the title "Very Reverend":

 Msgr. F. Thomas Jansen (1906–1942)
 Msgr. John A. Sullivan (1942–1963)
 Rev. John C. Witte (1963–1968)
 Rev. Casimir E. Sederak (1968–1971)
 Rev. Don C. Grass (1971–1983)
 Rev. Richard A. Emerson (1983)
 Msgr. Joseph A. Viater  (1983–1985)
 Rev. William E. Vogt (1985–1986)
 Rev. Andrew Daniels, OFM Cap  (1986–1992)
 Rev. Matthew Iwuji (1992–1997)
 Rev. Robert P. Gehring (1997–2007)
 Rev. Jon J. Plavcan (2007–2012)
 Rev. Michael J. Kopil (2012-2016)
 Rev. Kevin P. McCarthy (2016–2018)
 Rev. Michael Surufka, OFM (2019–)

See also
List of Catholic cathedrals in the United States
List of cathedrals in the United States

References

External links
Official Cathedral Site
Diocese of Gary Official Site

Christian organizations established in 1906
Holy Angels
Churches in the Roman Catholic Diocese of Gary
Gothic Revival church buildings in Indiana
Churches in Gary, Indiana
Churches in Lake County, Indiana
1906 establishments in Indiana